The 2014 FIBA 3x3 World Championships, hosted by Russia, was an international 3x3 basketball event that feature separate competitions for men's and women's national teams. The tournament was run from 5 June to 8 June 2014 in Moscow. It is co-organized by the FIBA.

Qatar won their first title after defeating the defending champions Serbia 18–13 in the men's final. In the women's it was the defending champions USA that defeated Russia 15-8.

Medalists

Participating teams

Men

Women

References

External links 
 Official website
 Event on 3x3 Planet

 
2014
2014 in 3x3 basketball
2013–14 in Russian basketball
Sports competitions in Moscow
International basketball competitions hosted by Russia